The M4 bayonet was introduced in 1944 for use with the M1 carbine. It was  built on the M3 fighting knife.

Description
The M4 bayonet, like the M3 fighting knife that preceded it, was designed for rapid production using a minimum of strategic metals and machine processes, it used a relatively narrow 6.75-inch bayonet-style spear-point blade with a sharpened 3.5-inch secondary edge. The blade was made of carbon steel, and was either blued or parkerized. Production of the grooved wooden handle was later simplified by forming the grip of stacked leather washers that were shaped by turning on a lathe, then polished and lacquered. The steel crossguard had a bayonet muzzle ring and the bayonet fastener is on the pommel. Later models used a black molded plastic handle. The basic design would be used for the later M5, M6 and M7 bayonets.

M8 and M8A1 Scabbard

There are two variations of this scabbard, both with an olive drab fiberglass body with steel throat. The early version M8 scabbard only had a belt loop and lacked the double hook that earlier bayonet scabbards had for attaching to load carrying equipment such as the M1910 Haversack. The improved M8A1 scabbard manufactured later in WW II has the M1910 bent wire hook. The scabbard throat flange is stamped "US M8" or "US M8A1" on the flat steel part along with manufacturer initials. Some M8 scabbards were later modified by adding the M1910 hook. Later M8A1 scabbards were manufactured with a modified extended tab on the web hanger to provide more clearance for the M5 bayonet which rubbed against the wider bayonet handle. This sheath is correct for all post-war US bayonets including the M4, M5, M6, and M7. It was also used with the M3 fighting knife.

See also
M3 fighting knife
M5 bayonet used by the M1 Garand
M6 bayonet used by the M14 rifle
M7 bayonet used by the M16 rifle
M9 bayonet

References

Bayonets of the United States
World War II infantry weapons of the United States
Infantry weapons of the Cold War
Weapons and ammunition introduced in 1944